Mpro may refer to:
 Electronic patient-reported outcome
 SARS coronavirus main proteinase, an enzyme